"The Leaving Song Pt. II" is a song by American rock band AFI. It was released as the second single from their sixth studio album Sing the Sorrow in 2003. "The Leaving Song Pt. II" was released to radio on June 3, 2003. It peaked at number 16 on the US Alternative Songs chart and number 27 in Australia.

It was featured on the soundtrack of Madden 2004.

Track listing
UK 7"
"The Leaving Song Pt. II" – 3:31
"The Great Disappointment" (demo) – 5:01

Australian tour edition CD
"The Leaving Song Pt. II" – 3:31
"This Celluloid Dream" (demo) – 4:18
"Synesthesia" (demo) – 4:35
"Girl's Not Grey" (final music video) – 3:11

Germany CD
"The Leaving Song Pt. II" – 3:31
"The Great Disappointment" (demo) – 5:01

EU Cassette
"The Leaving Song Pt. II" – 3:31

UK CD 1
"The Leaving Song Pt. II" – 3:31
"The Great Disappointment" (demo) – 5:01
"Paper Airplanes" (demo) – 4:04
"The Leaving Song Pt. II" (music video) – 3:32

UK CD 2
"The Leaving Song Pt. II" – 3:31
"...but home is nowhere" (demo) – 3:42
"The Leaving Song (demo) – 2:34

Music video
A music video was directed by Marc Webb and filmed at a warehouse in Los Angeles in May 2003.
The videoclip was released in June 2003

It features the band performing in suits in front of a moshing crowd, executing hardcore dancing style punch-and-kick moves. Members of the crowd are shown applying athletic tape and straight edge-culture gloves on their hands before the gig. The band members are shown preparing for the show as well. Havok drops the mic and walks off stage at the end of the video. The song used while the crowd is moshing was a song by the band Hatebreed.

Chart positions

References

External links
Watch "The Leaving Song Pt. II" on YouTube

2003 singles
AFI (band) songs
Song recordings produced by Butch Vig
Music videos directed by Marc Webb
2002 songs
DreamWorks Records singles
Songs written by Hunter Burgan
Songs written by Adam Carson
Songs written by Davey Havok
Songs written by Jade Puget